Basedale Priory or Baysdale Priory was a priory in North Yorkshire, England located  East from the parish church of Stokesley. It was a house of Cistercian nuns established in the 12th century and suppressed in 1539.

References

Monasteries in North Yorkshire
Cistercian nunneries in England